George Oakley Vance (25 May 1828 – 1910) was the Dean of Melbourne from 1894 until his death.
 
The son of William Ford Vance, who had been the vicar of Coseley, Vance was born in London and educated at King's College School, London and Lincoln College, Oxford. Emigrating to Australia he was ordained by Charles Perry, Bishop of Melbourne, in 1854. After curacies in Melbourne and Geelong he was appointed headmaster of Geelong Grammar School. He then held incumbencies in Chewton, Kyneton, Richmond and Kew.

References

1828 births
Anglican clergy from London
People educated at King's College School, London
Alumni of Lincoln College, Oxford
Australian headmasters
Deans of Melbourne
1910 deaths